Elizabeth Stanley  may refer to:

Elizabeth de Vere, Countess of Derby, married name Elizabeth Stanley, English noblewoman
Elizabeth Stanley, American actress
Elizabeth Stanley, Countess of Huntingdon (1588-1633), English noblewoman
Bessie Anderson Stanley, American poet